Magnetic translations are naturally defined operators acting on wave function on a two-dimensional particle in a magnetic field.

The motion of an electron in a magnetic field on a plane is described by the following four variables: guiding center coordinates  and the relative coordinates .

The guiding center coordinates are independent of the relative coordinates and, when quantized, satisfy
, 

Much like acting on a wave function  of a one-dimensional quantum particle by the operators  and  generate the shift of momentum or position of the particle, for the quantum particle in 2D in magnetic field one considers the magnetic translation operators
 
for any pair of numbers .

The magnetic translation operators corresponding to two different pairs  and  do not commute.

References

Magnetism
Quantum magnetism